The Ministry of Education is a ministry of the government of Ecuador, headquartered in Quito.

References

External links
 Ministry of Education 
Ecuador
Government of Ecuador